Gija Joseon (1120–194 BC) was a dynasty of Gojoseon allegedly founded by the sage Jizi (Gija), a member of the Shang dynasty royal house. Concrete evidence for Jizi's role in the history of Gojoseon is lacking, and the narrative has been challenged since the 20th century.

Understanding before 20th century

Chinese records
Chinese records before the Qin dynasty describe Gija (箕子) as the paternal uncle (or brother in other records) of the last king of the Shang dynasty, the tyrannical King Zhou, but contain no mention of king Zhou's relationship with Gojoseon. Gija was imprisoned by the tyrant until the downfall of Shang Kingdom, when King Wu of Zhou released him.

Records written after the Qin dynasty, when the Han dynasty and Gojoseon were at war, add that Gija led 5,000 to the east of present-day Beijing, as written in the "Geography" section of the Book of Han (although some, especially in China, believe him to have moved to present-day Korea), and became the founding king of Gija Joseon. In Sima Qian's Shi Ji, Gija is mentioned in the following sentence:

King Wu enfeoffed Gija to Joseon, though he was not a vassal (of Zhou)

(於是武王乃封箕子於朝鮮而不臣也).

Korean historiography
No contemporary Korean sources existed for Gija Joseon, and the oldest sources produced in Korea were from the Goryeo dynasty. The earliest Korean record about Gija Joseon can be seen from Samguk Yusa,

Later Dangun moved his capital to Asadal on T'aebaek-san and ruled 1500 years, until king Wu of Chou (ancient Chinese dynasty) placed Kija on the throne (traditional date 1122 BC). When Kija arrived, Dangun moved to Changtang-kyong and then returned to Asadal, where he became a mountain god at the age of 1908.

(御國一千五百年. 周虎{武}王卽位己卯, 封箕子於朝鮮, 壇君乃移於藏唐京, 後還隱於阿斯達爲山神, 壽一千九百八歲),

It was widely believed that Gija Joseon was located on the Korean Peninsula, replacing Gojoseon of Dangun. But some Korean scholars believed that Gija settled west of Gojoseon, based on records from "Geography" section of the Book of Han, and the Korean Samguk Yusa that suggests that Gojoseon continued to coexist with Gija Joseon after the migration of Gija. These scholars believed that Gija's influence was limited to western part of Gojoseon.

The Genealogy of the Cheongju Han Clan (청주한씨세보) lists the names of 73 rulers of Gija Joseon and their periods of reign; however, it is not widely accepted by current Korean mainstream historians.

Wiman Joseon is said to begin with the usurpation of the throne from Jun of Gojoseon and the line of kings descended from Gija.

Shin Chaeho's opinion
Shin Chaeho said that Gija Joseon (323 BC-194 BC) refers to the putative period of Beonjoseon, one of the Three Confederate States of Gojoseon, after the Marquess of Joseon from the Gi clan was invaded by Yan as shown in the records of Weilüe. Chinese traditional accounts indicate that Gihu's ancestor, Gija, was the same person as Jizi (both written as 箕子 in Hanzi/Hanja).

According to Sin Chaeho's Joseon Sangosa, Beonjoseon began disintegrating after its king had been killed by a rebel from the Chinese state of Yan at around 323 BC. With this, the five ministers of Beonjoseon began contending for the throne. Marquess of Joseon from the Gi clan joined in this struggle, and emerged victorious as the new king of Beonjoseon, defeating the competitors for the throne. He established Gija Joseon, named after his ancestor Gija.  During Gija Joseon, the king enjoyed strong sovereign powers. Eventually, in 94 BC, Gija Joseon fell after King Jun was overthrown by Wiman, who established Wiman Joseon in its place.

Controversy on whether Gija and Jizi were the same person
The Korean historian Kim Jung-bae claims that the association between Jizi and Joseon is wrong. He believed that the existence of Gija Joseon as a state established by Jizi was fabricated during Han dynasty. He further claims that the Bamboo Annals, and Confucius's Analects, which was the earliest extant text that referred to Jizi, did not say anything about his going to Gojoseon. Similarly, the Records of the Grand Historian, written soon after the conquest of Wiman Joseon by the Han dynasty, made no reference to Joseon in its discussions about Jizi and no reference to Jizi in its discussions about Joseon.

According to some sources, ancient Koreans claimed that Gija came from the Zhou dynasty but there is no archaeological evidence to support early involvement of the Chinese.

List of monarchs

See also
 History of Korea
 History of Manchuria
 Cheongju Han clan
 Haengju Ki clan
 Taewon Seonu clan
 Icheon Seo clan

Notes

References

Gojoseon
Gija Joseon
Former countries in Korean history
Former countries in Chinese history